is the second album  (excluding soundtrack albums) of the Morning Musume subgroup Minimoni. It was released February 11, 2004 under the Zetima label with the catalog number EPCE-5265, and peaked at number 11 on the Oricon sales charts.

Track listing
All lyrics and music were written and composed by Tsunku, with the exception of "Rock 'n' Roll Kenchōshozaichi", which was written and composed by Chisato Moritaka.
"Opening"
"Crazy About You"

"Lost Love"

References

External links
 Minimoni Songs 2 entry on the Hello! Project official website

Minimoni albums
2004 albums